Sosna is a surname. Notable people with the surname include:

Jiří Sosna (born 1960), Czech judoka
Kataržina Sosna (born 1990), Lithuanian racing cyclist
Krzysztof Sosna (born 1969), Polish triathlete

See also
 

Polish-language surnames
Jewish surnames
Ukrainian-language surnames